Agostino Ghesini (born 4 August 1958) is a retired male javelin thrower from Italy.

Biography
He finished in 23rd place at the 1984 Summer Olympics in Los Angeles, California. He set his personal best (89.12 m) in 1983.

Achievements

References

External links
 

1958 births
Living people
Italian male javelin throwers
Athletes (track and field) at the 1984 Summer Olympics
Olympic athletes of Italy
Sportspeople from Ravenna
World Athletics Championships athletes for Italy
Mediterranean Games gold medalists for Italy
Athletes (track and field) at the 1983 Mediterranean Games
Olympic male javelin throwers
Mediterranean Games medalists in athletics